Ennead Architects LLP (/ˈenēˌad/) is a New York City-based architectural firm. The firm was founded in 1963 by James Polshek, who left the firm in 2005 when it was known as Polshek Partnership. The firm's partners renamed their practice in mid-2010.

Project examples

Shanghai Planetarium, Shanghai, China (2020)
University of Michigan, Biological Science Building, Ann Arbor, MI (2019)
Peabody Essex Museum Expansion and Renovation, Salem, MA (2019)
Anderson Collection at Stanford University, Stanford, CA (2014)
 National Museum of American Jewish History, Philadelphia, PA (2010)
 Brooklyn Museum, Elizabeth A. Sackler Center for Feminist Art, Brooklyn, NY (2007)

 Carnegie Hall, Zankel Hall, New York, NY (2003)

The University of Texas at Austin, McCombs School of Business, Robert B. Rowling Hall, Austin, TX (2018)
Kansas State University, College of Architecture, Planning and Design, Manhattan, KS (2017)
Massachusetts College of Art and Design, Design and Media Center, Boston, MA (2016)
 Syracuse University, S.I. Newhouse School of Public Communications, Syracuse, NY (2007)

Stanford University, ChEM-H (Chemistry, Engineering & Medicine for Human Health) and the Wu Tsai Neurosciences Institute, Stanford, CA (2020)
University of Oregon, Knight Campus for Accelerating Scientific Impact, Eugene, OR (2020)

References

 
 Profile Series on polshek.com

External links

Architecture firms based in New York City
Design companies established in 1963
1963 establishments in New York City